Probable histone-lysine N-methyltransferase NSD2 is an enzyme that in humans is encoded by the NSD2 gene.

This gene encodes a protein that contains four domains present in other developmental proteins: a PWWP domain, an HMG box, a SET domain, and a PHD-type zinc finger. It is expressed ubiquitously in early development. 

Wolf-Hirschhorn syndrome (WHS) is a malformation syndrome associated with a hemizygous deletion of the distal short arm of chromosome 4. This gene maps to the 165 kb WHS critical region and has also been involved in the chromosomal translocation t(4;14)(p16.3;q32.3) in multiple myelomas. 

Alternative splicing of this gene results in multiple transcript variants encoding different isoforms. Some transcript variants are nonsense-mediated mRNA (NMD) decay candidates, hence not represented as reference sequences.

References

Further reading